Christian Farstad  (born 10 June 1969) is a two-time Canadian olympian in the sport of bobsleigh. He's the former CEO of Bobsleigh Canada Skeleton, former Director of Athlete and Community Relations for the Canadian Olympic Committee and is a graduate of Athabasca University. He was nominated for the Sport Leadership award at the Canadian Sport Awards in 2003.

Christian was the President of Bobsleigh Canada Skeleton 2002-2006, is the current Secretary General of Olympians Canada and was a founding board member of the Sport Dispute Resolution Centre of Canada (SDRCC).

Christian is a Chartered Financial Analyst (CFA), Certified Financial Planner (CFP), Certified Investment Manager (CIM) and Fellow of the Canadian Securities Industry (FCSI). He has been quoted in the Wall Street Journal, Dow Jones Newswire, Vancouver Sun, Globe and Mail 
and National Post Newspapers. He has also been interviewed on Global Television, CTV, and CBC television.

He is now a Wealth Advisor with ScotiaMcLeod in Vancouver.

References

External links
Bobsleigh Canada Skeleton
Christian Farstad
Canadian Sport Awards
SDRCC
BCS President
Olympians Canada
Farstad Retirement Website

Living people
1969 births
Sportspeople from Prince George, British Columbia
Olympic bobsledders of Canada
Canadian male bobsledders
Athabasca University alumni
Bobsledders at the 1992 Winter Olympics
Bobsledders at the 1994 Winter Olympics
CFA charterholders